is a Japanese voice actress who works for Aoni Production. She is married to voice actor Naoki Tatsuta.

Major roles
 Tsukino Ikuko, Grape (ep 24), and Hell Ant (ep 50) in Sailor Moon (xxxx)
 Kanna Natsuyama ("Angie Roberts" in the U.S. dub) in The Flying House (xxxx)
 Midori Shimura in Groizer X (1976)
 Jane in Akage no An (1979)
 Chiyo in Mobile Suit Gundam (1979)
 Fard Malaka Space Runaway Ideon (1980)
 Tenko Yokohama in Miss Machiko (1981–83)
 Pandora in Yattodetaman (1981)
 Michiko in Gyakuten! Ippatsuman (1982)
 Noriko Mabuchi in Animated Classics of Japanese Literature (1986)
 Satomi-sensei in Himitsu no Akko-chan (1988)
 Midori Higashi in Casshan (1993)
 Bibimba in Kinnikuman Nisei (2002)

Dubbing
Miracles (Belle Kao (Gloria Yip))

Notes

External links
 
 

1955 births
Living people
Voice actresses from Chiba Prefecture
Japanese voice actresses
Aoni Production voice actors